is a Prefectural Natural Park on and around the islands of Irabu and Shimojishima, Okinawa Prefecture, Japan. The islands, part of the Miyako island group, are adjacent but divided by a narrow channel. The park was established in 1995 and includes a designated marine zone of 23 km².

See also
 National Parks of Japan
 Iriomote-Ishigaki National Park
 Okinawa Kaigan Quasi-National Park
 Kumejima Prefectural Natural Park

References

External links
 Detailed map of the Park

Parks and gardens in Okinawa Prefecture
Protected areas established in 1995
1995 establishments in Japan